Pitch Perfect: Bumper in Berlin is an American  comedy television series developed by Megan Amram and Elizabeth Banks based on characters created by Kay Cannon. It is a television series spin-off of the film series Pitch Perfect. The series premiered on Peacock on November 23, 2022. In January 2023, the series was renewed for a second season.

Cast and characters

Main

 Adam DeVine as Bumper Allen
 Sarah Hyland as Heidi, Pieter's assistant who is also a secret songwriter. She is an American, but was an army brat.
 Jameela Jamil as Gisela, a former member of DSM and Pieter's ex-girlfriend
 Lera Abova as DJ Das Boot / Thea, Pieter's sister who is a famous Berlin DJ and music producer
 Flula Borg as Pieter Krämer, a former member of Das Sound Machine (DSM) and a music manager. DSM was disbanded after a public lip syncing scandal.

Recurring

 Katharina Thalbach as Ursula, the matron of the hostel

Episodes

Production
On September 21, 2021, Peacock gave a straight-to-series order to reboot the Pitch Perfect film series. The series is created by Megan Amram who is expected to executive produce alongside Elizabeth Banks, Max Handelman, Paul Brooks, Scott Neimeyer, and Adam DeVine. DeVine is set to star and reprise his role from the film series. Brownstone Productions, Gold Circle Films, and Universal Television are the companies involved with producing the series. On January 25, 2022, Flula Borg joined the main cast to reprise his role from Pitch Perfect 2. On February 10, 2022, it was reported that Todd Strauss-Schulson is set to direct the first two episodes of the series and executive produce the pilot. On March 4, 2022, Sarah Hyland, Jameela Jamil, and Lera Abova were cast as series regulars. A cappella experts Deke Sharon and Ed Boyer returned to arrange and vocal produce the a cappella performances. On January 9, 2023, Peacock renewed the series for a second season.

Filming on the series began in March 2022 in Berlin.

Music

Release 
The series was released on Peacock on November 23, 2022. The show can be seen on the W Network in Canada and via the Stack TV add-on with Prime Video.

Reception 
The review aggregator website Rotten Tomatoes reported an approval rating of 44% with an average rating of 6.2/10, based on 9 critic reviews. Metacritic, which uses a weighted average, assigned a score of 46 out of 100 based on 5 critics, indicating "mixed or average reviews".

References

External links
 
 

2022 American television series debuts
2020s American musical comedy television series
American television spin-offs
English-language television shows
Peacock (streaming service) original programming
Television series by Universal Television
Television series by Brownstone Productions
Live action television shows based on films
Television shows filmed in Germany
Television shows set in Berlin